Santiago González and Aisam-ul-Haq Qureshi defeated brothers Ken and Neal Skupski in the final, 3–6, 6–4, [10–6], to win the doubles tennis title at the 2019 U.S. Men's Clay Court Championships. The win earned the team their first ATP Tour title together, though it individually marked Gonzalez his 13th and Qureshi his 17th. The Skupski brothers were contending to win their second tour-level title as a team.

Max Mirnyi and Philipp Oswald were the defending champions, but Mirnyi retired from professional tennis at the end of 2018 and Oswald chose to compete in Marrakesh instead.

Seeds

Draw

Draw

References

External links
 Main draw

Doubles